WTON-FM (94.3 FM) is a classic hits and classic rock formatted broadcast radio station licensed to Staunton, Virginia, serving Staunton and Augusta County, Virginia.  WTON is owned and operated by High Impact Communications, Inc.

The station can be heard as far away as Lexington to the South. To the North, it can be heard up to Harrisonburg. WTON-FM can also be heard as far east as Waynesboro.

History
The station first took its callsign on February 11, 1988 and officially launched in November 1990 with a Light Adult Contemporary format, branded as "Star 94.3". In mid-January 2005, WTON switched to Classic Hits and Classic rock, as "Classic Hits; Star 94.3".

Sale
In late January 2008, WTON-FM and sister WTON-AM were put up for sale on eBay.

References

External links

TON-FM
Classic rock radio stations in the United States
Radio stations established in 1988